The men's dual moguls competition of the FIS Freestyle World Ski Championships 2011 was held at Deer Valley, United States on February 5.

Qualification

Elimination round

References

Dual moguls, men's